Aamar Bhuvan is a 2002 Bengali film directed by Mrinal Sen. The film depicts a place of India where people live peacefully and love each other despite the hatred and violence that scars the rest of the nation. For this film director Mrinal Sen won best director's award in Cairo Film Festival in 2002.

Plot 
The script is based on the novel 'Dhanjyotsna' written by Afsar Amed. After Sakhina and Nur's divorce, Sakhina has remarried Meher; a man who loves her but has difficulty providing for them and their three children. Nur went on to the Middle East and came back a rich man. He has remarried. Nur and Meher are cousins and Nur tries to help Meher (and Sakhina) by giving him work and lending him money. But when he returns Sakhina's prized nose-ring, which he had given her secretly during their marriage and not taken back during the divorce, and which Meher later pawned for some money, Sakhina is insulted and hurt.

Cast 
 Nandita Das as Sakhina
 Kaushik Sen as Meher
 Saswata Chatterjee as Nur
 Bibhas Chakraborty
 Arun Mukherjee

Awards

Cairo International film festival
 Best director: Mrinal Sen (won)
 Best actress: Nandita Das (won)
 Golden pyramid (nominated)

In India
 Anandalok Award: Best Male Playback Singer for Srikanta Acharya in 2003

References

External links 
 

2002 films
Films directed by Mrinal Sen
Bengali-language Indian films
2000s Bengali-language films